Mădălin Vlad Lemnaru (born 26 March 1989) is a Romanian rugby union player. He plays in the wing and occasionally fullback position for amateur SuperLiga club Timişoara and București based European Challenge Cup side the Wolves. Dumitru also plays for Romania's national team the Oaks.

Lemnaru made his international debut in 2009 in the wing position against Spain. He played for Romania in the IRB Nations Cup and in their 2015 Rugby World Cup qualifying and previously appearing for them in the 2011 Rugby World Cup.

References

External links

 Mădălin Lemnaru at Timișoara Saracens website

1989 births
Romanian rugby union players
Romania international rugby union players
Rugby union wings
București Wolves players
CSA Steaua București (rugby union) players 
SCM Rugby Timișoara players
Living people
Sportspeople from Brașov